The 2000 Missouri Valley Conference men's soccer season was the 10th season of men's varsity soccer in the conference.

The 2000 Missouri Valley Conference Men's Soccer Tournament was hosted by the Missouri Valley Conference and won by Creighton.

Teams

MVC Tournament

See also 

 Missouri Valley Conference
 Missouri Valley Conference men's soccer tournament
 2000 NCAA Division I men's soccer season
 2000 in American soccer

References 

Missouri Valley Conference
2000 NCAA Division I men's soccer season